The Jazz Review was a jazz criticism magazine founded by Nat Hentoff and Martin Williams in New York City in 1958. It was published until 1961. Hentoff and Williams were co-editors throughout its brief existence (which lasted 22 issues).

Many issues of The Jazz Review are available at Jazz Studies Online which assesses its quality as follows:

A regular feature of The Jazz Review was "The Blues," a page of transcriptions of the lyrics from blues recordings by a variety of singers, e.g., in the seventh issue:

 "Crying Mother Blues," Red Nelson
 "Six Cold Feet in the Ground," Leroy Carr
 "Patrol Wagon Blues," Henry Allen

Contributors
In addition to the magazine's founders, the following writers contributed articles to The Jazz Review:
 Joachim Berendt
 Stanley Dance
 André Hodeir
 LeRoi Jones
 Orrin Keepnews
 Mimi Melnick
 Paul Oliver
 Harvey Pekar
 Ross Russell
 William Russo
 Gunther Schuller
 Hsio Wen Shih
 Studs Terkel

Later incarnation 
A later California-based magazine also titled The Jazz Review, edited by Ken Borgers and Bill Wasserzieher, appeared in 1991–1992, with cover stories on Dizzy Gillespie, Miles Davis, Charlie Haden, and other artists.

References

External links
Jazz Studies Online

Music magazines published in the United States
Defunct magazines published in the United States
Jazz magazines
Magazines established in 1958
Magazines disestablished in 1961
Magazines published in New York City